In Greek mythology, Teledice (Ancient Greek: Τηλεδικη Têledikê means "far-reaching"), the nymph wife of the first mortal king Phoroneus of Peloponesse, thus mother of Apis and Niobe. Other sources called the consort(s) of Phoroneus as either Cerdo, Cinna, or Laodice also a nymph or Perimede, or Peitho and Europe.

Notes

References 

 Gaius Julius Hyginus, Fabulae from The Myths of Hyginus translated and edited by Mary Grant. University of Kansas Publications in Humanistic Studies. Online version at the Topos Text Project.
Pausanias, Description of Greece with an English Translation by W.H.S. Jones, Litt.D., and H.A. Ormerod, M.A., in 4 Volumes. Cambridge, MA, Harvard University Press; London, William Heinemann Ltd. 1918. . Online version at the Perseus Digital Library
Pausanias, Graeciae Descriptio. 3 vols. Leipzig, Teubner. 1903.  Greek text available at the Perseus Digital Library.
Pseudo-Apollodorus, The Library with an English Translation by Sir James George Frazer, F.B.A., F.R.S. in 2 Volumes, Cambridge, MA, Harvard University Press; London, William Heinemann Ltd. 1921. . Online version at the Perseus Digital Library. Greek text available from the same website.

Nymphs
Argive characters in Greek mythology